Phelsuma parva is a species of gecko endemic to southeastern Madagascar.

References

Phelsuma
Endemic fauna of Madagascar
Reptiles of Madagascar
Reptiles described in 1983